Megalota is a genus of moths belonging to the subfamily Olethreutinae of the family Tortricidae.

Species
delphinosema species group
Megalota beckeri J.W. Brown, 2009
Megalota bicolorana J.W. Brown, 2009
Megalota ceratovalva J.W. Brown, 2009
Megalota chamelana J.W. Brown, 2009
Megalota crassana J.W. Brown, 2009
Megalota deceptana J.W. Brown, 2009
Megalota delphinosema (Walsingham, 1914)
Megalota flintana J.W. Brown, 2009
Megalota gutierrezi J.W. Brown, 2009
Megalota jamaicana J.W. Brown, 2009
Megalota longisetana J.W. Brown, 2009
Megalota ochreoapex J.W. Brown, 2009
Megalota ricana J.W. Brown, 2009
Megalota simpliciana J.W. Brown, 2009
Megalota spinulosa J.W. Brown, 2009
pastranai species group
Megalota pastranai J.W. Brown, 2009
plenana species group
Megalota plenana (Walker, 1863)
submicans species group
Megalota aquilonaris J.W. Brown, 2009
Megalota cacaulana J.W. Brown, 2009
Megalota macrososia J.W. Brown, 2009
Megalota peruviana J.W. Brown, 2009
Megalota submicans (Walsingham, 1897)
Megalota synchysis J.W. Brown, 2009
Megalota vulgaris J.W. Brown, 2009
unknown species group
Megalota anceps (Meyrick, 1909)
Megalota antefracta Diakonoff, 1981
Megalota archana Aarvik, 2004
Megalota fallax (Meyrick, 1909)
Megalota geminus Diakonoff, 1973
Megalota helicana (Meyrick, 1881)
Megalota johni Razowksi & B. Landry, 2008
Megalota namibiana Aarvik, 2004
Megalota ouentoroi Razowski, 2013
Megalota purpurana Aarvik, 2004
Megalota rhopalitis (Meyrick, 1920)
Megalota solida Diakonoff, 1973
Megalota uncimacula (Turner, 1925)
Megalota vera Diakonoff, 1966

See also
List of Tortricidae genera

References

 , 1966, Zool. Verh. Leiden 85: 52.
  2005 World Catalogue of Insects, 5
  2009: The discovery of Megalota in the Neotropics, with a revision of the New World species (Lepidoptera: Tortricidae: Olethreutini). Zootaxa, 2279: 1-50. Abstract & excerpt PDF
 , 2006, Monographs on Australian Lepidoptera Volume 10
 , 2008: The Tortricidae (Lepidoptera) of the Galapagos Islands, Ecuador. Revue Suisse de Zoologie 115 (1): 185–220.

External links
tortricidae.com

Olethreutini
Tortricidae genera
Taxa named by Alexey Diakonoff